Adelolecia is a genus of crustose lichens in the family Lecanoraceae. The genus was circumscribed by Hannes Hertel and Josef Hafellner in 1984. The genus was formerly classified in the family Ramalinaceae, but molecular phylogenetic analysis showed it to belong to the Lecanoraceae.

Species
Adelolecia kolaensis 
Adelolecia pilati 
Adelolecia rhododendrina 
Adelolecia sonorae

References

Lecanoraceae
Lichen genera
Lecanorales genera
Taxa described in 1984
Taxa named by Josef Hafellner
Taxa named by Hannes Hertel